Noah Cappe (born December 27, 1977) is a Canadian actor and television host best known for his work on Good Witch, Carnival Eats and The Bachelorette Canada.

Career

Cappe's most notable acting role is that of Derek Sanders, a role that he began in a series of The Good Witch TV movies before reprising the role on the television series. In 2007, he appeared in the winning video for Matthew Good's song "Born Losers".

Cappe's most notable hosting positions are on the Food Network's Carnival Eats, and the W Network's The Bachelorette Canada, a job he received thanks in part to a tweet he made expressing his excitement for the upcoming show and asking if they needed a host.

Personal life 
Cappe is one of 8 children. At the age of 23, Cappe went on a trip to Israel where he met then 19-year-old Keri West. They formed a relationship after discovering they lived a short distance apart in Toronto. Cappe proposed to Keri in 2014 with a ring made from her grandparents' jewelry in front of an audience at Frontier College. In 2017 they legally married at City hall after having previous celebrations with family. The couple pursued adopting a child since the year 2017, and welcomed a baby girl named Wolfie in 2021.

Filmography

Film

Television

Video games

Music videos

References

External links
 

1977 births
Living people
20th-century Canadian male actors
21st-century Canadian male actors
Canadian male film actors
Canadian male television actors
Canadian male video game actors
Canadian male voice actors
Canadian television hosts
Male actors from Toronto